Michigan Township is one of fourteen townships in Clinton County, Indiana. As of the 2010 census, its population was 1,649 and it contained 675 housing units.  The township was named for the Michigan Road, an early thoroughfare through the area.

History
Mahlon Shinn and Robert Edwards were the township's first white settlers, arriving in 1830 and followed the same year by many more.  The township was organized in March 1831.

Geography
Prior to settlement the land was heavily timbered with oak, poplar, walnut, sugar maple, beech, elm, ironwood, dogwood and pawpaw.

Cities and towns
 Michigantown

Unincorporated towns
 Avery
 Boyleston

Adjacent townships
 Warren Township (north)
 Forest Township (northeast)
 Johnson Township (east)
 Kirklin Township (south)
 Jackson Township (southwest)
 Center Township (west)
 Union Township (west)
 Owen Township (northwest)

Major highways
  U.S. Route 421
  Indiana State Road 29

Cemeteries
The township contains seven cemeteries: Brandon, Hopewell Cemeteries, Layman, Layton, Old Whiteman, Paris and Whiteman.

References
 United States Census Bureau cartographic boundary files
 U.S. Board on Geographic Names

Townships in Clinton County, Indiana
Townships in Indiana
Populated places established in 1831
1831 establishments in Indiana